National Coney Island is a Coney Island-style restaurant based in Michigan that specializes in Greek-American cuisine. It is a corporation that has more than 20 National Coney Island locations in the Metro Detroit area.

History 
The first establishment opened in Macomb Mall in Roseville, Michigan. James Giftos, a Greek immigrant, was the founder of National Coney Island in 1965. At that point, the menu was very limited, only including Coney Island hot dogs, Coney Island style loose hamburgers, a few sandwiches, potato chips, and soda pop. The item selection was hand-painted on wooden menu boards, advertising a 35 cents hot dog.
In the late sixties, shoppers traveled from a great distance to patronize regional malls, therefore National Coney started implementing new locations in those areas.
Giftos was able to open two new stores in St. Clair Shores (1969) and Detroit (1971), due to the success of the Macomb location. Years later, Giftos thought to expand his menu (which was the same for all three locations). He wanted to make his restaurants more family oriented, as well as updating the decor to set his chain apart from other Coney Island style restaurants in the area.
In following this new change, the expansion of this Coney Island chain did not explode until the mid-1980s to early 1990s. This is when the chain really grew to eleven locations, each with unique interior, some implementing drive-thrus, and others offering beer and wine.

Menu 

National Coney Island hosts Coney Island hot dogs. Other items on the menu include French fries, loose burgers, and a various list of burgers and sandwiches. Some Greek items on the menu are gyros, rice pudding, and saganaki. The most famous sandwich of National Coney Island is the “hani”: a chicken-finger pita, which National Coney Island offers in different variants with different kinds of sauces and cheese. A regular hani special contains American and Swiss cheese, while a southwest hani uses pepperjack cheese and chipotle sauce. Another popular item on the National Coney Island menu is the Mr. Pop Burger. This burger is named by the company mascot, Mr. Pop. The burger is made up of sourdough bread, a 1/3 lb. patty, lettuce, tomato, red onion, 1000 island dressing, and pickles on the side. National Coney Island produces its own chili. The chili is available cooked and ready for the customers or frozen and sold separately. The chili is often sold within a Coney Kit as well. This kit contains a brick of chili, two dozen frozen hot dogs, two dozen buns, a bowl of onions, and a bottle of mustard.

National Coney Island in efforts to gain market share from competitor Leo's has started to offer limited-time items including the "Coney grilled cheese" and adding pineapple to hot dogs. National is considered the "Foodie" coney island.

Locations 

National Coney Island locations are usually on the East side of Michigan.  Some cities that host National Coney Island are: Clawson, Clinton Twp., Grosse Pointe/Detroit, Macomb Twp., McNamara Terminal Wayne County Airport, North Terminal Wayne County Airport, Rochester Hills, Roseville, Royal Oak, Shelby Twp., St. Clair Shores, Sterling Heights, Troy, Utica, Warren, and Waterford.  In the future, Giftos’s son, Tom Giftos Junior, who has been currently running the business plans to drift away from sit down restaurants to a lot more “express” style National Coney Islands which will be opening up in places like airports, stadiums, and colleges.
The corporate business plans on expanding the company at least two units per year. Stores can range from 6,000 to 9,000 square feet. Several stores also contain a drive-thru.  The corporate headquarters is located in Roseville, which is where the first National Coney Island was established.

The I-696 (11 Mile Road)/Gratiot Avenue Roseville store has an interior wall mural that echoes the style and is an homage of the Diego Rivera Detroit Industry Murals that is in the Rivera Court of the Detroit Institute of Arts.  Instead of producing cars on an assembly line, chili hot dogs are a depicted as a work in progress.  It implicitly depicts the change of the economy from manufacturing to a service economy.  The underlying real life irony is that the headquarters/plant of National Coney Island, went from auto parts to producing product (e.g., hot dogs and chili) for the chain.

See also
 Coney Island hot dogl
 History of the Greek Americans in Metro Detroit

References

Notes

Citations

Further reading

External links 

Greek-American culture in Michigan
Hot dog restaurants in the United States
Restaurants in Detroit
Restaurants established in 1965
1965 establishments in Michigan